L'Avare is a 1980 French comedy film written and directed by Louis de Funès and Jean Girault, and starring de Funès. The English title of the film is The Miser. It is an adaptation of Molière's famous comedy L'Avare (The Miser).

De Funès tried to draw out the unhappy side of the character. Harpagon, unloved by humanity, is driven to an obsessive love of money.

Cast 

 Louis de Funès: Harpagon
 : Cléante
 : Valère
 Michel Galabru: Maître Jacques
 : Anselme
 Claude Gensac: Frosine
 Claire Dupray: Élise, Miser's daughter
 : Marianne, Cléante's girlfriend
 Bernard Menez: La Flèche, Cléante's valet
 Henri Génès: the commissioner
 Michel Modo: la Merluche, Harpagon's attendant
 Guy Grosso: Brindavoine, Harpagon's attendant
 : Maître Simon
 : Dame Claude, the housemaid
 Madeleine Barbulée: Marianne's mother

Reception 
The film is rated 70% Fresh by Rotten Tomatoes.

References

External links
 
 
 L'Avare (1980) Films de France

1980 films
Films based on works by Molière
French films based on plays
French comedy films
1980s French-language films
Films directed by Jean Girault
1980 comedy films
Films based on works by Plautus
1980s French films